Malik Hall (born in 1996), better known by his stage name Haleek Maul, is an American rapper and record producer. He is a founding member of the collective called On the Tanz. He has collaborated with the likes of Deniro Farrar, Shady Blaze, Hot Sugar, and Saul Williams. Noisey has described him as "the new hustler of horrorcore".

Early life
Haleek Maul was born Malik Hall in Brooklyn, New York. He grew up in Barbados.

Career
In 2012, Haleek Maul released his debut EP, Oxyconteen. Spin named it the "Rap Release of the Week", while Fact placed it at number 48 on the "50 Best Albums of 2012" list. In that year, he also released a collaborative mixtape with Chicago production duo Supreme Cuts, titled Chrome Lips. Clash included it on the "Top 10 Mixtapes of the Year" list.

He released a mixtape, Prince Midas, in 2015, an EP, In Permanence, in 2018, and his debut solo studio album, Errol, in 2020.

Discography

Studio albums
 Errol (2020)

Mixtapes
 Chrome Lips (2012) 
 Prince Midas (2015)

EPs
 Oxyconteen (2012)
 In Permanence (2018)

Singles
 "Ceiling Fan" (2019)
 "Halo" (2019)
 "Abyss" (2019)
 "Lucid" (2019)
 "Get2high" (2020)

Guest appearances
 Deniro Farrar and Shady Blaze - "Cold Blood" from Kill or Be Killed (2012)
 Hot Sugar - "I Don't Wanna B Judged" from Midi Murder (2012)
 Mishka & Rad Reef - "Hyperbolic Chamber Music II" (2013)
 Ryan Hemsworth - "Day/Night/Sleep System" from Guilt Trips (2013)
 Le1f - "Tha Whip" from Fly Zone (2013)
 Black Noise x BK Beats - "RIP" from Nonbelievers (2014)
 P. Morris - "Hot Life / Blood King" from Low (2016)
 Saul Williams - "All Coltrane Solos at Once" from Martyr Loser King (2016)
 Chino Amobi - "Eigengrau (Children of Hell II)" from Paradiso (2017)
 Dasychira - "Scalaris" from Haptics (2018)

References

External links
 
 

1996 births
Living people
Rappers from New York (state)
21st-century American rappers
Lex Records artists